Heukcheon is a river of South Korea. It is a river of the Han River system and is a tributary of the Namhan River. The basin area is 314.02 km 2 and the total length is 37 km. Topographically, black forests are the largest part of the watershed with 73.92%  and the agricultural area is 7.17%. The upper part of the river consists of gravel, pumice stone and rock. The river is highly affected by nonpoint pollution sources.

References

Rivers of South Korea